Grange is a ghost town in Woodbury County, in the U.S. state of Iowa.

History
A post office was established at Grange in 1877, and was discontinued in 1878. The Grange Cemetery marks the site.

References

Geography of Woodbury County, Iowa